This is a list of all  NFL players who had outstanding performances throughout the 1930s and have been compiled together into this fantasy group. The team was selected by voters of the Pro Football Hall of Fame retroactively in 1969 to mark the league’s 50th anniversary.

See also
 History of the National Football League

References 

National Football League All-Decade Teams
1930s in sports
Foot
Foot
National Football League records and achievements
National Football League lists